Gennadi Ivanovich Poloka (15 July 1930, Kuybyshev – 5 December 2014, Moscow) was a Soviet and Russian film director, screenwriter, producer and actor. People's Artist of Russia (1998). IV Class Order "For Merit to the Fatherland" (2011).

Early years
Gennadi Poloka was born in Kuybyshev (now Samara). His family name comes from his Slovak great-grandfather who left Austria-Hungary for the Russian Empire just before the start of the World War I, saving from ethnic cleansing of Slavs. Poloka commented on his ethnicity: I come from a multinational family: there were Poles, Germans, Ukrainians... I have a strange surname. Every time I arrive in some country, there's always a question at the press-conference about my ethnicity. But I have a straight answer: 'I am Russian'. I really love Russia and can't live more than ten days abroad. Poloka decided to become a film director since the age of 10, after he saw The Great Waltz. He survived the war in evacuation in Novosibirsk, together with his mother.

Education
After the end of war Poloka tried to enter director's courses, but was rejected for being too young. From 1947 to 1951 he studied at the Mikhail Shchepkin Higher Theatre School, actor's lab. In 1957 he graduated from VGIK, finally becoming a film director.

Career
Poloka started his career in cinematography in 1956. He directed several documentary films and worked as an assistant director with Grigori Aleksandrov, Mikhail Romm, Boris Barnet and others. In 1962 a children's movie Kapron Fishnet was released, co-directed by Poloka and Levan Shengeliya. Four years later he directed his first independent feature – The Republic of ShKID based on the acclaimed children's novel by two former orphans (who served as screenwriters). It became one of the leaders of the Soviet box office in 1967. Between 1967 and 1968 Poloka worked on Intervention based on the drama of the same name by Lev Slavin. It was not released for political reasons until 1989.

Poloka later worked in various genres: adventure film (One of Us), comedy-romance (Melody for Two Voices), criminal comedy (Was There Karotin?) and adventure comedy (The Return of the Battleship), which Poloka also wrote and produced. Between 1976 and 1980 he worked at Studio Ekran as the head of the Musical Films Studio department. In 1996 he was awarded a prize by the presidential council film festival Kinotavr. In addition, he appeared in films as an actor.

Death
Gennadi Poloka died at the age of 84 in Moscow in 2014. He was buried at Vagankovo Cemetery. He was survived by his wife Olga and two daughters, Natalia and Veronika.

Selected filmography

References

External links
 Alexander Fedorov. Постскриптум к прошлому (1991) 
 Интервью: Концерт Высоцкого для всей Одессы 

1930 births
2014 deaths
People's Artists of Russia
Russian film directors
20th-century Russian screenwriters
20th-century Russian male writers
Male screenwriters
Russian male writers
Russian cinematographers
Place of death missing
Soviet film directors
Soviet screenwriters
Soviet cinematographers
Academic staff of High Courses for Scriptwriters and Film Directors
Gerasimov Institute of Cinematography alumni
Recipients of the Order "For Merit to the Fatherland", 4th class
Burials at Vagankovo Cemetery